Romain Taofifénua (born 14 September 1990) is a French rugby union player, playing as Lock for Toulon in the Top 14.

Club career
Taofifénua's rugby career began in 2005, while playing for Limoges. He later moved to play for Clermont in the 2007–08 Top 14 season. However, Taofifénua failed to make any appearances for the senior side, and signed with USA Perpignan for the 2008–09 Top 14 season. Despite signing in 2008, he didn't receive his first appearance for the club until 20 August 2010, during the 2010–11 Top 14 season. In that season, he made 3 appearances for Perpignan. In the 2011–12 Top 14 season, he became a more consistent player in the team, making 23 starts in 28 appearances. Most notable, a 34–20 win against defending champions Toulouse. After the 2013–14 Top 14 season, where Perpignan were relegated, Taofifénua signed with Toulon, who were both European and Domestic champions. His first Toulon appearance came on 15 August 2014 against Bayonne, in a 29–15 victory.

International career
Romain has played in all age grade levels for France, having represented the U18s, U19s and U20s. It was when playing for the U20s in the 2009 Six Nations Under 20s Championship when he first caught the eye of Perpignan selectors. Haven performed well for Perpignan in 2010, he was selected for the 2010 IRB Junior World Championship, playing in 3 matches - against Ireland and Argentina twice. He was one of five try scorers in the 5th place play-off, whom was won by France 37–23.

Taofifénua was selected for the French senior side for their 2012 tour to Argentina, and made his first appearance in an uncapped game for XV du Président against Serge Betsen's XV on 6 June 2012. He made his first official test appearance a week later, coming of the bench for Yoann Maestri on the 74th minute.

Personal life
Taofifénua is the son of Willy Taofifénua who used to play for FC Grenoble, and the older brother of Sébastien Taofifénua, who also started his career with  Union Sportive Arlequins Perpignan. He is of Wallisian heritage.

Honours

International 
 France
Six Nations Championship: 2022
Grand Slam: 2022

Club 
 Toulon
European Rugby Champions Cup: 2014–2015

References

External links
France profile at FFR

1990 births
Living people
French rugby union players
People from Mont-de-Marsan
USA Perpignan players
RC Toulonnais players
Rugby union locks
France international rugby union players
Rugby union players from Wallis and Futuna
French people of Wallis and Futuna descent
Sportspeople from Landes (department)
Lyon OU players